Dougherty is the name of a phantom island that was believed to be located in the extreme south of the Pacific Ocean, roughly halfway between Cape Horn and New Zealand. He described it as 5–6 miles long with a high bluff to the northeast and covered in snow.

However, thorough exploration of the area in the late 19th and early 20th centuries established that the island does not exist. Captain Davis of the Nimrod suggested that the most likely explanation was that Dougherty, Keates, and Stannard had all been deceived by fog banks or icebergs (none, after all, claimed to have actually landed on the island): "I am inclined to think Dougherty Island has melted."

The island continued to appear on maps as late as 1934.

See also 
 Royal Company's Islands
 Emerald Island (phantom)
 Nimrod Islands
 Sandy Island, New Caledonia, a phantom island that remained on many maps until the early 21st century

References

Hamilton-Paterson, James. The Great deep: the sea and its thresholds. New York: Holt, 1993. 
Ramsay, Raymond H. No Longer on the Map: discovering places that never were. New York: Viking Press, 1972. 

Phantom subantarctic islands